Social abuse is a form of abuse that cuts off or tries to cut off the victim from their social network, including their community, friends, or family.  It also includes attempts to harm a victim's relationships or reputation, through acts such as humiliating the victim in public, spreading rumors, and otherwise manipulating the victim's image. Social abuse often results in some form of isolation, which removes the victim from any sense of social belongingness outside of relationships the abuser approves of. It can be a kind of psychological abuse, emotional abuse or spiritual abuse.  It may also involve attempts to monopolise the victim's skills and resources.

References

See also 
 Religious abuse
 Isolation to facilitate abuse
 Psychological abuse
 Relational aggression
 Dating violence
 Intimate partner violence

Abuse